Mary Frances "Debbie" Reynolds (April 1, 1932 – December 28, 2016) was an American actress, singer, and businesswoman. Her career spanned almost 70 years. She was nominated for the Golden Globe Award for Most Promising Newcomer for her portrayal of Helen Kane in the 1950 film Three Little Words. Her breakout role was her first leading role, as Kathy Selden in Singin' in the Rain (1952). Her other successes include The Affairs of Dobie Gillis (1953), Susan Slept Here (1954), Bundle of Joy (1956 Golden Globe nomination), The Catered Affair (1956 National Board of Review Best Supporting Actress Winner), and Tammy and the Bachelor (1957), in which her performance of the song "Tammy" reached number one on the Billboard music charts. In 1959, she released her first pop music album, titled Debbie.

She starred in Singin' in the Rain (1952), How the West Was Won (1962), and The Unsinkable Molly Brown (1964), a biographical film about the famously boisterous Molly Brown. Her performance as Brown earned her a nomination for the Academy Award for Best Actress. Her other films include The Singing Nun (1966), Divorce American Style (1967), What's the Matter with Helen? (1971), Charlotte's Web (1973), Mother (1996) (Golden Globe nomination), and In & Out (1997). Reynolds was also a cabaret performer. In 1979, she founded the Debbie Reynolds Dance Studio in North Hollywood, which was demolished in 2019 after being sold at auction, despite efforts to turn it into a museum.

In 1969, she starred on television in The Debbie Reynolds Show, for which she received a Golden Globe nomination. In 1973, Reynolds starred in a Broadway revival of the musical Irene and was nominated for the Tony Award for Best Lead Actress in a Musical. She was also nominated for a Daytime Emmy Award for her performance in A Gift of Love (1999) and an Emmy Award for playing Grace's mother Bobbi on Will & Grace. At the turn of the millennium, Reynolds reached a new, younger generation with her role as Aggie Cromwell in Disney's Halloweentown series. In 1988, she released her autobiography, titled Debbie: My Life. In 2013, she released a second autobiography, Unsinkable: A Memoir.

Reynolds also had several business ventures, including ownership of a dance studio and a Las Vegas hotel and casino, and she was an avid collector of film memorabilia, beginning with items purchased at the landmark 1970 MGM auction. She served as president of The Thalians, an organization dedicated to mental-health causes. Reynolds continued to perform successfully on stage, television, and film into her 80s. In January 2015, Reynolds received the Screen Actors Guild Life Achievement Award. In 2016, she received the Jean Hersholt Humanitarian Award. In the same year, a documentary about her life was released titled Bright Lights: Starring Carrie Fisher and Debbie Reynolds, which turned out to be her final film appearance; the film premiered on HBO on January 7, 2017.

Reynolds died following a hemorrhagic stroke on December 28, 2016, one day after the death of her daughter Carrie Fisher.

Early life 

Mary Frances Reynolds was born on April 1, 1932, in El Paso, Texas, to Maxene N. "Minnie" Harman and Raymond Francis "Ray" Reynolds, a carpenter who worked for the Southern Pacific Railroad. She was of Scotch-Irish and English ancestry and was raised in a strict Nazarene church of her domineering mother. She had an older brother, William, who was two years her senior. Reynolds was a Girl Scout, once saying that she wanted to die as the world's oldest living Girl Scout. Reynolds was also a member of The International Order of Job's Daughters.

Her mother took in laundry for income, while they lived in a shack on Magnolia Street in El Paso. "We may have been poor," she said in a 1963 interview, "but we always had something to eat, even if Dad had to go out in the desert and shoot jackrabbits."

Her family moved to Burbank, California, in 1939. When Reynolds was a 16-year-old student at Burbank High School in 1948, she won the Miss Burbank beauty contest. Soon after, she was offered a contract with Warner Brothers and was given the stage name "Debbie" by studio head Jack L. Warner.

One of her closest high school friends said that she rarely dated during her teenaged years in Burbank. 

Reynolds agreed, saying, "when I started, I didn't even know how to dress. I wore dungarees and a shirt. I had no money, no taste, and no training." Her friend adds:

Career

Film and television 
Reynolds was discovered by talent scouts from Warner Bros. and MGM, who were at the 1948 Miss Burbank contest. Both companies wanted her to sign up with their studio, and had to flip a coin to see which one got her. Warner Bros. won the coin toss, and she was with the studio for two years. When Warner Bros. stopped producing musicals, she moved to MGM.

With MGM, Reynolds regularly appeared in movie musicals during the 1950s, and had several hit records during the period. Her song "Aba Daba Honeymoon" (featured in the film Two Weeks with Love (1950) and sung as a duet with co-star Carleton Carpenter) was the first soundtrack recording to become a top-of-the-chart gold record, reaching number three on the Billboard charts.

Her performance in the film greatly impressed the studio, which then gave her a co-starring role in what became her highest-profile film, Singin' in the Rain (1952), a satire on movie-making in Hollywood during the transition from silent to sound pictures. It co-starred Gene Kelly, whom she called a "great dancer and cinematic genius," adding, "He made me a star. I was 18 and he taught me how to dance and how to work hard and be dedicated." In 1956, she appeared in the musical Bundle of Joy with her then-husband, Eddie Fisher.

Reynolds was one of 14 top-billed names in How the West Was Won (1962) but she was the only one who appeared throughout, the story largely following the life and times of her character Lilith Prescott. In the film, she sang three songs: What Was Your Name in the States?, as her pioneering family begin their westward journey; Raise a Ruckus Tonight, starting a party around a wagon train camp fire; and, three times, Home in the Meadow – to the tune of Greensleeves with lyrics by Sammy Cahn.

Her starring role in The Unsinkable Molly Brown (1964) led to a nomination for the Academy Award for Best Actress. Reynolds noted that she initially had issues with its director, Charles Walters. "He didn't want me," she said. "He wanted Shirley MacLaine," who at the time was unable to take the role. "He said, 'You are totally wrong for the part." But six weeks into production, he reversed his opinion. "He came to me and said, "I have to admit that I was wrong. You are playing the role really well. I'm pleased." Reynolds also played in Goodbye Charlie, a 1964 comedy film about a callous womanizer who gets his just reward. It was adapted from George Axelrod's play Goodbye, Charlie and also starred Tony Curtis and Pat Boone.

She next portrayed Jeanine Deckers in The Singing Nun (1966). In what Reynolds once called the "stupidest mistake of my entire career", she made headlines in 1970 after instigating a fight with the NBC television network over cigarette advertising on her weekly television show. Although she was television's highest-paid female performer at the time, she quit the show for breaking its contract:

When NBC explained to Reynolds that banning cigarette commercials from her show would be impossible, she kept her resolve. The show drew mixed reviews, but according to NBC, it captured about 42% of the nation's viewing audience. She said later she was especially concerned about the commercials because of the number of children watching the show. She did quit doing the show after about a year, which she said had cost her about $2 million of lost income: "Maybe I was a fool to quit the show, but at least I was an honest fool. I'm not a phony or pretender. With me, it wasn't a question of money, but integrity. I'm the one who has to live with myself." The dispute would have been rendered moot and in Reynolds' favor anyway had she not resigned; by 1971, the Public Health Cigarette Smoking Act (which had been passed into law before she left the show) would ban all radio and television advertising for tobacco products.

Reynolds played the title role in the Hanna-Barbera animated musical Charlotte's Web (1973), in which she originated the song "Mother Earth and Father Time". Reynolds continued to make other appearances in film and television. She played Helen Chappel Hackett's mother, Deedee Chappel, on an episode of Wings titled, "If It's Not One Thing, It's Your Mother", which originally aired on November 22, 1994.

From 1999 to 2006, she played Grace Adler's theatrical mother, Bobbi Adler, on the NBC sitcom Will & Grace, which earned Reynolds her only Emmy Award nomination for Outstanding Guest Actress in a Comedy Series in 2000. She played a recurring role in the Disney Channel Original Movie Halloweentown film series as Aggie Cromwell. Reynolds made a guest appearance as a presenter at the 69th Academy Awards in 1997.

In 2000, Reynolds took up a recurring voice role on the children's television program Rugrats, playing the grandmother of two of the characters. In 2001, she co-starred with Elizabeth Taylor, Shirley MacLaine, and Joan Collins in the comedy These Old Broads, a television movie written for her by her daughter, Carrie Fisher. She had a cameo role as herself in the 2004 film Connie and Carla. In 2013, she appeared in Behind the Candelabra, as the mother of Liberace.

Reynolds appears with her daughter in Bright Lights: Starring Carrie Fisher and Debbie Reynolds, a 2016 documentary about the very close relationship between the two. It premiered at the 2016 Cannes Film Festival. The television premiere was January 7, 2017, on HBO. According to USA Today, the film is "an intimate portrait of Hollywood royalty ... [it] loosely chronicles their lives through interviews, photos, footage, and vintage home movies... It culminates in a moving scene, just as Reynolds is preparing to receive the 2015 Screen Actors Guild Life Achievement Award, which Fisher presented to her mom."

Music career and cabaret 
Her recording of the song "Tammy" (1957; from Tammy and the Bachelor), earned her a gold record. It was a number one single on the Billboard pop charts in 1957. In the movie (the first of the Tammy film series), she co-starred with Leslie Nielsen.

Reynolds also scored two other top-25 Billboard hits with "A Very Special Love" (number 20 in January 1958) and "Am I That Easy to Forget" (number 25 in March 1960)—a pop-music version of a country-music hit made famous by Carl Belew (in 1959), Skeeter Davis (in 1960), and several years later by singer Engelbert Humperdinck.

In 1991, she released an album titled The Best of Debbie Reynolds.

For 10 years, she headlined for about three months a year in Las Vegas's Riviera Hotel. She enjoyed live shows, though that type of performing "was extremely strenuous," she said in 1966:

With a performing schedule of two shows a night, seven nights a week, it's probably the toughest kind of show business, but in my opinion, the most rewarding. I like the feeling of being able to change stage bits and business when I want. You can't do that in motion pictures or TV.

As part of her nightclub act, Reynolds was noted for doing impressions of celebrities such as Eva and Zsa Zsa Gabor, Mae West, Barbra Streisand, Phyllis Diller, and Bette Davis. Her impersonation of Davis was inspired following their co-starring roles in the 1956 film, The Catered Affair. Reynolds had started doing stage impersonations as a teenager; her impersonation of Betty Hutton was performed as a singing number during the Miss Burbank contest in 1948.

Reynolds' last recording was a 1992 Christmas album with Donald O'Connor entitled Christmas with Donald and Debbie, arranged and conducted by Angelo DiPippo.

Reynolds was also a French horn player. Gene Kelly, reflecting on Reynolds's sudden fame, recalled, "There were times when Debbie was more interested in playing the French horn somewhere in the San Fernando Valley or attending a Girl Scout meeting....She didn’t realize she was a movie star all of a sudden."

Stage work 

With limited film and television opportunities coming her way, Reynolds accepted an opportunity to make her Broadway debut. She starred in the 1973 revival of Irene, a musical first produced 60 years before. When asked why she waited so long to appear in a Broadway play, she explained:

Reynolds and her daughter Carrie both made their Broadway debuts in the play. Per reports, the production broke records for the highest weekly gross of any musical. For that production, she received a Tony nomination. Reynolds also starred in a self-titled Broadway revue, Debbie, in 1976. She toured with Harve Presnell in Annie Get Your Gun, then wrapped up the Broadway run of Woman of the Year in 1983. In the late 1980s, Reynolds repeated her role as Molly Brown in the stage version of The Unsinkable Molly Brown, first opposite Presnell (repeating his original Broadway and movie role) and later with Ron Raines.

 Best Foot Forward (1953) (Dallas State Fair)
 Irene (1973) (Broadway and US national tour)
 Debbie (1976) (Broadway)
 Annie Get Your Gun (1977) (San Francisco and Los Angeles)
 Woman of the Year (1982) (Broadway) (replacement for Lauren Bacall)
 The Unsinkable Molly Brown (1989) (US national tour)
 Irene (2008) Perth Western Australia

In 2010, she appeared in her own West End show Debbie Reynolds: Alive and Fabulous.

Film history preservation 
Reynolds amassed a large collection of movie memorabilia, beginning with items from the landmark 1970 Metro-Goldwyn-Mayer auction, and she displayed them, first in a museum at her Las Vegas hotel and casino during the 1990s and later in a museum close to the Kodak Theatre in Los Angeles.

The museum was to relocate to be the centerpiece of the Belle Island Village tourist attraction in the resort city of Pigeon Forge, Tennessee, but the developer went bankrupt. The museum filed for Chapter 11 bankruptcy in June 2009. The most valuable asset of the museum was Reynolds' collection. Todd Fisher, Reynolds' son, announced that his mother was "heartbroken" to have to auction off the collection. It was valued at $10.79 million in the bankruptcy filing. Los Angeles auction firm Profiles in History was given the responsibility of conducting a series of auctions. Among the "more than 3500 costumes, 20,000 photographs, and thousands of movie posters, costume sketches, and props" included in the sales were Charlie Chaplin's bowler hat and Marilyn Monroe's white "subway dress", whose skirt is lifted up by the breeze from a passing subway train in the film The Seven Year Itch (1955). The dress sold for $4.6 million in 2011; the final auction was held in May 2014.

Business ventures 
In 1979, Reynolds opened her own dance studio in North Hollywood. In 1983, she released an exercise video, Do It Debbie's Way!. She purchased the Clarion Hotel and Casino, a hotel and casino in Las Vegas, in 1992. She renamed it the Debbie Reynolds Hollywood Hotel. It was not a success. In 1997, Reynolds was forced to declare bankruptcy. In June 2010, she replaced Ivana Trump answering reader queries for the weekly paper Globe.

Marriages and later life 

Reynolds was married three times. Her first marriage was to singer Eddie Fisher in 1955. They became the parents of Carrie Fisher and Todd Fisher. The couple divorced in 1959 when it was revealed shortly after the death of Elizabeth Taylor's husband Mike Todd that Fisher had been having an affair with her; Taylor and Reynolds were good friends at the time. The Eddie FisherElizabeth Taylor affair was a great public scandal, which led to the cancellation of Eddie Fisher's television show.

In 2011, Reynolds was on The Oprah Winfrey Show just weeks before Elizabeth Taylor's death. She explained that Taylor and she happened to be traveling at the same time on the ocean liner Queen Elizabeth some time in the late 1960s or early 1970s, when they reconciled. Reynolds sent a note to Taylor's room, and Taylor sent a note in reply asking to have dinner with Reynolds and end their feud. As Reynolds described it, "we had a wonderful evening with a lot of laughs." In 1972, she noted the bright side of the divorce and her remarriage:

Reynolds' second marriage, to millionaire businessman Harry Karl, lasted from 1960 to 1973. For a period during the 1960s, she stopped working at the studio on Friday afternoons to attend Girl Scout meetings, since she was the leader of the Girl Scout Troop of which her 13-year-old daughter Carrie and her stepdaughter Tina Karl, also 13, were members. Reynolds later found herself in financial difficulty because of Karl's gambling and bad investments. Reynolds' third marriage was to real estate developer Richard Hamlett from 1984 to 1996.

In 2011, Reynolds stepped down after 56 years of involvement in The Thalians, a charitable organization devoted to children and adults with mental-health issues.

Reynolds was hospitalized in October 2012 at Cedars-Sinai Medical Center in Los Angeles due to an adverse reaction to medication. She cancelled appearances and concert engagements for the next three months.

Death and legacy 

On December 23, 2016, Reynolds' daughter, actress and writer Carrie Fisher, suffered a medical emergency on a transatlantic flight from London to Los Angeles, and died on December 27, 2016, at the age of 60 at Ronald Reagan UCLA Medical Center. The following day, December 28, Reynolds was taken by ambulance to Cedars-Sinai Medical Center in Los Angeles, after suffering a "severe stroke", according to her son. Later that afternoon, Reynolds was pronounced dead in the hospital; she was 84 years old. On January 9, 2017, her cause of death was determined to be an intracerebral hemorrhage, with hypertension a contributing factor.

Todd Fisher later said that Reynolds had been seriously affected by her daughter's death, and that her grief was partially responsible for her stroke, noting that his mother had stated, "I want to be with Carrie", shortly before she died. During an interview for the December 30, 2016 airing of the ABC-TV program 20/20, Todd Fisher elaborated on this, saying that his mother had joined his sister in death because Reynolds "didn't want to leave Carrie and did not want her to be alone". He added, "she didn't die of a broken heart" as some news reports had implied, but rather "just left to be with Carrie".

Reynolds was entombed, while her daughter was cremated. A portion of Carrie Fisher's ashes was laid to rest beside Reynolds' crypt at Forest Lawn Memorial Park in Hollywood Hills during a larger joint memorial service held on March 25, while the remainder of Fisher's ashes are held in a giant, novelty Prozac pill.

Awards and honors 
Reynolds was the 1955 Hasty Pudding Woman of the Year. Her footprints and handprints are preserved at Grauman's Chinese Theatre in Hollywood, California. She also has a star on the Hollywood Walk of Fame, at 6654 Hollywood Boulevard, for live performance and a Golden Palm Star on the Palm Springs, California, Walk of Stars dedicated to her. In keeping with the celebrity tradition of the Shenandoah Apple Blossom Festival of Winchester, Virginia, Reynolds was honored as the Grand Marshal of the 2011 ABF that took place from April 26 to May 1, 2011.

On November 4, 2006, Reynolds received the Lifetime Achievement in the Arts Award from Chapman University (Orange, California). On May 17, 2007, she was awarded an honorary degree of Doctor of Humane Letters from the University of Nevada, Reno, where she had contributed for many years to the film studies program.

Filmography 

Short subjects
 A Visit with Debbie Reynolds (1959)
 The Story of a Dress (1964)
 In the Picture (2012)

Partial television credits

Radio broadcasts

See also 
 List of American film actresses
 List of people from California
 List of people from Texas

References

Further reading

External links 

 
 
 
 
 
 
 Debbie Reynolds at TVGuide.com
 
 Photographs and literature
 The Official Academy Awards Database: Type "Debbie Reynolds" at the Nominee box
 Debbie Reynolds profile at Aveleyman.com

1932 births
2016 deaths
20th-century American actresses
20th-century American singers
20th-century American women singers
20th-century American women writers
21st-century American actresses
21st-century American non-fiction writers
21st-century American singers
21st-century American women singers
21st-century American women writers
Actresses from Burbank, California
Actresses from El Paso, Texas
American autobiographers
American beauty pageant winners
American collectors
American female dancers
American women pop singers
American film actresses
American impressionists (entertainers)
American members of the Church of the Nazarene
American musical theatre actresses
American people of English descent
American people of Scotch-Irish descent
American stage actresses
American tap dancers
American television actresses
American voice actresses
American women non-fiction writers
Burials at Forest Lawn Memorial Park (Hollywood Hills)
Carrie Fisher
Dancers from California
Dancers from Texas
Deaths from hypertension
Film memorabilia
Jean Hersholt Humanitarian Award winners
Metro-Goldwyn-Mayer contract players
MGM Records artists
Musicians from Burbank, California
Musicians from El Paso, Texas
Traditional pop music singers
Warner Bros. contract players
Western (genre) film actresses
Women autobiographers
Women collectors
Writers from California
Writers from Texas
United Service Organizations entertainers